Gunnbjörn Ulfsson (fl. c. 10th century), also Gunnbjörn Ulf-Krakuson, was a Norwegian settler of Iceland. He was reportedly the first European to sight Greenland. A number of modern place names in Greenland commemorate Gunnbjörn, most notably Gunnbjørn Fjeld.

Sources
The only reference to Gunnbjörn is from the Book of Settlement of Iceland (Landnámabók). It is stated that his sons lived in Iceland's West fjords and a note is made that Gunnbjörnssker are named after him. Gunnbjörn was blown off course while sailing from Norway to Iceland. He and his crew sighted islands (Gunnbjörn's skerries) lying close off the coast of Greenland, and reported this find but did not land. Since Greenland is physically part of North America, separated from Ellesmere Island by only a narrow strait, this sighting could also have been the first European connection with North America. The exact date of this event is not recorded in the sagas. Various sources cite dates ranging from 876 to 932. The first records of purposeful visits to Gunnbjörn's skerries were made by Snæbjörn Galti around 978 and soon after by Erik the Red who also explored the main island of Greenland, and soon established a settlement.

Waldemar Lehn (1911–2005), professor emeritus at the University of Manitoba and an expert in atmospheric refraction and mirages, argued that the skerries Gunnbjörn saw could be explained as the sighting of Greenland's coast via the refraction of a superior mirage. Such phenomena were not unknown to the Norse, who called them hillingar.

References

Norwegian explorers
Norse settlements in Greenland
Scandinavian explorers of North America
Germanic pagans
10th-century explorers